The 1973 Omloop Het Volk was the 28th edition of the Omloop Het Volk cycle race and was held on 3 March 1973. The race started and finished in Ghent. The race was won by Eddy Merckx.

General classification

References

1973
Omloop Het Nieuwsblad
Omloop Het Nieuwsblad